The 27th San Diego Film Critics Society Awards were announced on January 6, 2023. The nominations were announced on January 3, 2023, with The Banshees of Inisherin and Everything Everywhere All at Once leading the nominations with eleven each, followed by The Fabelmans with eight.

The Banshees of Inisherin won the most awards with six wins, including Best Picture.

Winners and nominees

Winners are listed at the top of each list in bold, while the runner-ups and nominees for each category are listed under them.

References

External links
 Official Site

2022 film awards
2022 in American cinema
2022